Jan-Michael Gambill was the defending champion, but did not participate this year.

Lleyton Hewitt won the title, defeating Tim Henman 6–4, 7–6(7–2) in the final.

Seeds

  Andre Agassi (second round)
  Pete Sampras (second round, withdrew)
  Marcelo Ríos (quarterfinals, retired)
  Nicolás Lapentti (quarterfinals)
  Tim Henman (final)
  Lleyton Hewitt (champion)
  Álbert Costa (semifinals)
  Patrick Rafter (first round)

Draw

Finals

Top half

Bottom half

External links
 2000 Tennis Channel Open draw

Singles